Martin Glaberman (December 13, 1918 – December 17, 2001) was an American Marxist writer on labor, historian, academic, and autoworker.

Biography

Glaberman was associated with the Johnson-Forest Tendency, a radical left group which understood the Soviet Union as a state capitalist society that split from the Trotskyist Socialist Workers Party, which understood the Soviet Union as a degenerated workers' state.

In 1950, the Johnson-Forest Tendency left the Trotskyist movement and became known as the Correspondence Publishing Committee. When this group suffered a major split in 1955 with a large number supporting Raya Dunayevskaya (or "Forest" of "Johnson-Forest") and forming a new group called the News and Letters Committees, Glaberman remained loyal to C. L. R. James ("Johnson") and the Correspondence group. James advised Correspondence from exile in Britain. It remains a matter of dispute whether the majority in 1955 supported James or Dunayevskaya. Glaberman claimed in New Politics that the majority supported James but historian Kent Worcester claimed the opposite in an important biography of C. L. R. James.

In 1962, when Grace Lee Boggs, James Boggs, Lyman Paine, and Freddy Paine split from Correspondence Publishing Committee in a third worldist direction, Glaberman and a small number of other activists remained loyal to C. L. R. James, largely in Detroit, and started a new group to continue James's legacy. He was a major figure in the new group, Facing Reality, until he proposed its dissolution in 1970, over the objections of James, because Glaberman felt it was too tiny to operate effectively. He continued to write and publish widely until his death and established a now defunct publishing company, Bewick Editions to keep James' work in print. He was for many years, until his death, a sponsor of New Politics and served as an associate editor of Radical America, along with individuals such as Paul Buhle.

Glaberman has been described as a legendary figure in Detroit radical circles and he influenced activists that would play a major role in the Dodge Revolutionary Union Movement and the League of Revolutionary Black Workers. He was a professor and later professor emeritus at Wayne State University as he resumed his academic path after retiring from factory work.

Bibliography

Books

 Wartime Strikes: The Struggles Against the No-Strike Pledge in the UAW during World War Two, Bewick Editions 1980, Detroit, Michigan. ISBN 978-0935590111.
 Marxism for Our Times: C.L.R. James on Revolutionary Organisation (editor), University Press of Mississippi 1999, ISBN 978-1578061518.
 with Staughton Lynd: Punching Out. Selected Writings of Martin Glaberman. Charles H. Kerr Press, Chicago, IL 2004, ISBN 0-88286-263-4.

Pamphlets

Punching Out (1952)
Union Committeemen and Wildcat Strikes (1955)
Negro Americans take the Lead - A Statement on the Crisis in American Civilization (1964)
Be His Payment High or Low: The American Working Class of the 1960s (1965)
Mao as Dialectician (1971)
The Working Class and Social Change (1975)
Working for Wages: The Roots of Insurgency(1999) (co-authored)

Personal papers, archives
The Martin and Jessie Glaberman Papers at the Walter P. Reuther Library in Detroit, Michigan, contain more than 30 linear feet of archival material related to the life and work of the Glabermans. Documents, "reflect their many years of involvement in the labor, civil rights and women's movements. Material includes correspondence, radical publications, speeches, and interviews on their involvements and interests such as the Correspondence Publishing Committee/Company, C.L.R.James and the Socialist Workers Party." The collection is open for research.

References

Sources

 Kent Worcester, C.L.R. James: A Political Biography (Albany: State University of New York Press, 1996)

External links
 Marty Glaberman page Rich Gibson's web page
 Martin Glaberman archive at Marxist Internet Archive.

1918 births
2001 deaths
20th-century American historians
American male non-fiction writers
American Marxists
American socialists
Marxist writers
American anti-racism activists
Writers from Detroit
Wayne State University faculty
Activists from Detroit
20th-century American male writers
Historians from Michigan